Vanessa Ruth Waldref (born 1980) is an American lawyer who has served as the United States attorney for the Eastern District of Washington since October 2021.

Early life and education 
Waldref is a native of Spokane, Washington. Her sister, Amber Waldref, served as a member of the Spokane City Council. She earned a Bachelor of Arts degree from Georgetown University in 2002 and a Juris Doctor from the Georgetown University Law Center in 2008.

Career 
Waldref served as a law clerk for Judge John D. Bates of the United States District Court for the District of Columbia. She was an associate at Morrison & Foerster from 2008 to 2010, Lukins & Annis from 2010 to 2011, and Lee & Hayes from 2012 to 2013. She served as an Assistant United States Attorney for the Eastern District of Washington from 2013 to 2020. She has most recently served as a trial attorney in the United States Department of Justice Environment and Natural Resources Division.

United States attorney 
Waldref was nominated to serve as United States attorney for the Eastern District of Washington on July 26, 2021. On September 23, 2021, her nomination was reported out of committee. On September 30, 2021, her nomination was confirmed in the United States Senate by voice vote. She was sworn into office on October 7, 2021, by chief judge Stanley Bastian. She is the first woman to serve as U.S. attorney for the Eastern District of Washington.

Personal life 
Waldref and her husband, Jeff Brogan, have one child and live in Silver Spring, Maryland.

References 

1980 births
Living people
21st-century American women lawyers
21st-century American lawyers
Georgetown University alumni
Georgetown University Law Center alumni
Lawyers from Spokane, Washington
People associated with Morrison & Foerster
People from Spokane, Washington
United States Attorneys for the Eastern District of Washington
Washington (state) lawyers